Julia Seitz (born 14 February 1994) is a German ice hockey player for ECDC Memmingen and the German national team. She participated at the 2015 IIHF Women's World Championship.

References

1994 births
Living people
German women's ice hockey forwards